Lokomotiv stadium is a football stadium in Chernihiv. The stadium was built nearby the Chernihiv Ovruch railway and the Monument to Soldiers Liberators in Victory Square.

Basic information

The stadium is near the territory of the Chernihiv Ovruch railway, nearby there are also the Khimik Sports Complex and Tekstylschyk stadium. There is a "tribune" of a row of six or seven wooden benches, where the local youth hang out for beer and seeds in the evening. In 2016 a reconstruction plan have been put in place. In 2017 the city of Chernihiv wanted to reconstruct the stadium "Locomotive" and planned to spend ₴14 million from the city budget on the reconstruction of Lokomotiv stadium. In 2017, the mayor, Vladyslav Atroshenko, in turn announced a project for the reconstruction of the Lokomotiv Stadium on Zhabynskoho Street. Its cost is at least ₴70 million. He said that the city has already three stadiums, the main one Gagarin Stadium. The second is the Yunist Stadium and the third stadium is private, Chernihiv Arena at ZAZ.

Stadium during the war
The stadium suffered  during the battles for Chernihiv in February-April 2022. In particular, the fence of the stadium after the shelling by the Russian occupiers and the stands were damaged.

Using
 The stadium was used for the home matches of Desna Chernihiv in the Ukrainian Amateur Football Championship
 The stadium was used also for WFC Lehenda-ShVSM Chernihiv and Spartak ShVSM Chernihiv the female teams in Chernihiv
 The stadium was used for Desna Chernihiv U14, Desna Chernihiv U19 and Desna Chernihiv U21 as the training ground

See also
 List of sports venues in Chernihiv
 Lokomotyv Stadium

External links
СТАДИОН ЛОКОМОТИВ (ЧЕРНИГОВ, УКРАИНА)’2012
Стадион "Локомотив" (Чернигов)

References

1950 establishments in Ukraine
Football venues in Chernihiv
Football venues in Chernihiv Oblast
Multi-purpose stadiums in Ukraine
Sports venues in Chernihiv
Sports complexes
Buildings and structures in Chernihiv
Sports venues built in the Soviet Union
Sports complexes in Ukraine
Monuments and memorials to Yuri Gagarin
Chernihiv
Sports venues in Chernihiv Oblast